Banyan Tree School is a CBSE affiliated school in the Lodhi Colony Institutional area of New Delhi.

The school was originally established as Ram Krishan Kulwant Rai School in 1986 by Ram Krishan Kulwant Rai (RK KR for short) charitable trust. It was renamed to Banyan Tree school after the 2007 verdict from a 2005 case against RK KR charitable trust.

References

Schools in Delhi
1986 establishments in Delhi
Educational institutions established in 1986